Line 3 of the Wuxi Metro is a rapid transit line in Wuxi, China. It was opened on 28 October 2020. The line is 28.5 km long with 21 stations.

Opening timeline

Stations (north to south)

References

3
2020 establishments in China
Railway lines opened in 2020
Airport rail links in China